Now Shirvan Kola (also Romanized as Now Shīrvān Kolā; also known as Nūshīrvān Kalā Chārī and Nūshīrvān Kolā Chārī) is a village in Esbu Kola Rural District, in the Central District of Babol County, Mazandaran Province, Iran. At the 2006 census, its population was 632, in 177 families.

See also 
 Ban Shirvan
 Bi Bi Shirvan
 Karkhaneh-ye Qand-e Shirvan
 Shirvan
 Shirvan County
 Shirvan, Iran
 Shirvan, Lorestan
 Shirvan Mahalleh
 Shirvan Rural District
 Shirvan District
 Shirvan Shahlu

References 

Populated places in Babol County